Leicester Airport was an airfield operational in the mid-20th century in Leicester, Massachusetts. It was located adjacent and to the west of the Worcester Regional Airport.

References

Leicester, Massachusetts
Defunct airports in Massachusetts
Airports in Worcester County, Massachusetts